Jerrybuccinum explorator is a species of sea snail, a marine gastropod mollusk in the family Buccinoidea (unassigned), the true whelks.

References

Buccinoidea (unassigned)
Gastropods described in 2008